"Ambergris" is the 18th episode of the fourth season of the American animated comedy series Bob's Burgers, and the 63rd episode overall. Written by Scott Jacobson, the episode sees the Belcher children—Tina (Dan Mintz), Gene (Eugene Mirman), and Louise (Kristen Schaal)—discovering a lump of ambergris, which they decide to sell illegally with the assistance of former bank robber and family friend Mickey (guest voiced by Bill Hader) upon discovering its high monetary value. Meanwhile, Mr. Fischoeder (guest voiced by Kevin Kline) brings in his neurotic brother Felix (guest voiced by Zach Galifianakis) to help Bob (H. Jon Benjamin) fix the plumbing system in his restaurant's bathroom.

"Ambergris" originally aired on April 20, 2014 on Fox and drew an audience of 1.52 million viewers. Nonetheless, critical reviews of the episode from The A.V. Club and Paste were generally complimentary towards its humor and plot lines, with the latter review giving particular praise to Galifianakis' guest role as Felix Fischoeder.

Plot
While scavenging for washed-up items at the beach, Tina, Gene, and Louise discover a strange lump with a peculiar smell, which they keep. At Bob's Burgers, Mr. Fischoeder informs Bob that his neurotic brother Felix, whose inheritance has recently run out, will be "doing some of the landlording" around the restaurant. Bob then asks an uneasy Felix to call a plumber to fix the bathroom's faulty water system. Later that day, Tina researches on the lump, discovering that it is a piece of ambergris—a substance excreted by sperm whales and highly valued by perfumers—and can sell for up to $30,000. Despite the selling of ambergris being prohibited by law, Louise hatches a plan and conspires with her siblings to sell the ambergris on the black market with the help of ex-bank robber Mickey, who now works at the Wonder Wharf.

Felix returns and excitedly announces his plan to completely renovate the bathroom and host an elaborate unveiling party, despite Bob's objections. Meanwhile, Mickey calls Louise—who is now unhealthily obsessed with the ambergris—and says that he will arrange a meeting with a co-worker known as "The Nose" (Dom Irrera), who can sniff the ambergris and confirm its authenticity. Louise meets with The Nose by herself and decides to cut Mickey out of his promised share of the money, despite her siblings' objections. The trade takes place, only for Louise to receive $12 rather than the promised $30,000; she finds a note from Tina, who had switched the ambergris lump with a cantaloupe wrapped in dirty socks before the trade. Tina and Gene rush to Mickey and try to give him the lump, but he reveals his intention to use the money to buy a tank and start robbing banks again. Frustrated, Tina and Gene run away with the lump, pursued by Louise, Mickey, and The Nose. Finding herself cornered, Tina flings it over the others' heads and into a deep fryer, where it melts.

One week later, the bathroom unveiling party is being held, with the Belchers, the Fischoeder brothers, Teddy (Larry Murphy), and a Brazilian DJ in attendance. However, the bathroom's overly modern redesign has rendered the sink and the toilets indistinguishable, and the plumbing still does not work. When Felix asks for his brother's opinion and receives an indifferent response, he accuses him of never being supportive and locks himself in the bathroom. Mr. Fischoeder and the party guests manage to lure Felix out, however, by performing a chant about him, and Louise expresses her gratitude that she and her siblings "never fight or act crazy."

Production

Reception
"Ambergris" first aired in the United States on April 20, 2014 on Fox, as a part of the Animation Domination programming block. The episode was watched by 1.52 million viewers and received a 0.6/3 Nielsen rating in the 18–49 demographic, becoming the third most-watched program of the Animation Domination block for the night, but also garnering the lowest ratings of any Bob's Burgers episode to date.

David Kallison of The A.V. Club gave the episode a B+ grade, describing it as "funny, with one-liners dropping almost every other beat," and particularly praising "the jokes that are unique to [the show's] characters." Kallison felt that the episode's subplot involving Felix "delivers some good lines" but was "less satisfying narratively" than the main plot, adding that the Belcher children "easily have all the best lines" and noting: "Ambergris' finds the sweet spot between plot, humor, and sentimentality when it's revealed in the end that that Louise was carrying a fake rock to the deal, thanks to Tina's last-minute switcheroo... Despite the absurdity of the episode, it feels like Tina and Louise really are sisters who really do love each other in a realistically begrudging way."

Robert Ham of Paste rated the episode 9.1 out of 10 and stated that both plot lines "added up to an immensely satisfying episode with some of the most laugh-out-loud moments and lines of the whole season. Ham was complimentary of Zach Galifianikis' guest performance as Felix, writing that he "does a great job playing this whole thing with some of the subtlety he brought to the otherwise unsubtle Due Date."

References

External links
 "Ambergris" at Fox
 

2014 American television episodes
Bob's Burgers (season 4) episodes